Kenneth Onley (14 December 1914 – 23 August 1981) was an Australian rules footballer who played with Hawthorn in the Victorian Football League (VFL).

Onley later served in the Australian Army during World War II, being Mentioned in Despatches in 1945 for distinguished service in the South-West Pacific.

Notes

External links 

1914 births
1981 deaths
Australian rules footballers from Victoria (Australia)
Hawthorn Football Club players
Military personnel from Victoria (Australia)
Australian Army personnel of World War II